Herschel Island may refer to:
 Herschel Island, an island in the Arctic's Beaufort Sea
 Herschel Island (Chile), a Chilean island near the Drake Passage
 Herschel Island (ship, 1956), see Boats of the Mackenzie River watershed